The allergic march (also called atopic march) is a medical term used to explain the natural history of atopic manifestations. The allergic march is characterized by some antibody responses to immunoglobulin E (IgE) and clinical symptoms that may appear in childhood, and continue for years or decades and often changing with age.
The atopic march is a term that describes the progression of atopic disorders, from eczema in young infants and toddlers to allergic rhinitis and finally to asthma in adulthood.
Symptoms include atopic dermatitis, food allergy, allergic rhinitis and asthma.

See also
 Atopy

References

Type I hypersensitivity